Eupithecia sodalis is a moth in the family Geometridae. It is found in Equatorial Guinea (Bioko).

References

Moths described in 1937
sodalis
Moths of Africa